The Abaqulusi Local Municipality council within the South African Zululand District Municipality consists of forty-four members elected by mixed-member proportional representation. Twenty-two councillors are elected by first-past-the-post voting in twenty-two wards, while the remaining twenty-two are chosen from party lists so that the total number of party representatives is proportional to the number of votes received.

In the election of 3 August 2016 no party obtained a majority. The Inkatha Freedom Party (IFP) formed a government with the support of the Democratic Alliance (DA) and the Economic Freedom Fighters (EFF).

In the election of 1 November 2021 again no party obtained a majority, with the IFP obtaining a plurality of twenty-one seats.

Results 
The following table shows the composition of the council after past elections.

December 2000 election

The following table shows the results of the 2000 election.

March 2006 election

The following table shows the results of the 2006 election.

May 2011 election

The following table shows the results of the 2011 election.

August 2016 election

The following table shows the results of the 2016 election.

August 2016 to November 2021 by-elections 
In a by election held in March 2019 the ANC won a ward previously held by the IFP, reconstituting the council as follows:

November 2021 election

The following table shows the results of the 2021 election.

By-elections from November 2021
The following by-elections were held to fill vacant ward seats in the period from November 2021.

After the death of the previous IFP councillor in a car accident, a by-election was held on 30 November. The IFP candidate improved the party's showing, increasing their vote share from 34% to 59%.

References

Abaqulusi
Elections in KwaZulu-Natal
Zululand District Municipality